Miss Diva 2020 was the 8th edition of the Miss Diva beauty pageant held on February 22, 2020. A total of 20 contestants were shortlisted from various auditions across the country. Vartika Singh crowned Adline Castelino as her successor and she represented India at Miss Universe 2020. Shefali Sood crowned Aavriti Choudhary as her successor and she represented India at Miss Supranational 2021. Miss Diva 2018 Runner up Roshni Sheoran crowned Neha Jaiswal as her successor. Anntonia Porsild, Miss Supranational 2019 graced the event. This was the first edition of Miss Diva under Liva Fluid Fashion.

On 16 May 2021, Adline Castelino represented India at Miss Universe 2020 held at Seminole Hard Rock Hotel & Casino in Hollywood, Florida, United States and placed 3rd Runner-up. This was India's highest placement in Miss Universe since Lara Dutta who won the competition in 2000 and broke the 20-year drought placing the Runner-up ever since Celina Jaitley placed the 4th Runner-up in 2001.

Final results
Color keys

Special Awards

Background
In 2019, Liva Fluid Fashion acquired the title sponsorship rights for Miss Diva. On 11 November 2019, the organization announced in a press conference that the pageant will be held in February 2020. Contestants will be selected through auditions in various cities across the country. Those shortlisted contestants will go through final round of auditions in Mumbai to get top finalists who will compete at pageant. Miss Universe 2000, Lara Dutta will serve as the mentor.

Format
A new format was introduced by the organization for this edition. Top 10 candidates were selected based on their performance in the preliminary segment and closed door interview. The Top 10 delegates had an opportunity to speak about themselves in an opening statement. They further competed in swimsuit and evening gown rounds to determine the Final 5. A common question was asked to all the Top 5 delegates. They were finalized into Top 3.

Contestants
The following are the 20 contestants participating in the Liva Miss Diva 2020:
Color key

Grand Finale Judges
 Anntonia Porsild - Miss Supranational 2019 from Thailand
 Asha Bhat - Miss Supranational 2014 from India
 Anil Kapoor - Bollywood Actor
 Aditya Roy Kapoor - Bollywood Actor
 Lara Dutta - Miss Universe 2000
 Nikhil Mehra - Designer
 Shivan Bhatiya - Fashion Designer
 Narresh Kukreja - Fashion Designer
 Gavin Miguel - Designer

Selection of participants
Twenty delegates would be selected to compete in the grand finale. Among them, thirteen participants were selected from various rounds of city audition. Five finalists were selected through Campus Princess 2019 auditions.
The winner of Miss North-East Diva, a regional contest conducted by the Miss India Organization, for aspirants from the Northeast India gets direct entry in the Top 20. This competition was won by Malashya Kashyap. One delegate got a Wildcard entry, whose winner was decided on the basis of public vote. Vaishnavi Ganesh won the Wild Card entry.

City Finalists
Following are the finalists selected in auditions conducted at various cities of India. They would be further shortlisted and finalized as the contestants of Liva Miss Diva 2020 pageant. Few delegates selected by the Miss India Organization competed in the Wildcard round in Mumbai. The winner of this round would be selected with a combination of public voting & internal jury members.

Color key

Campus Princess
The winner of Campus Princess 2019 gets direct entry to the contest. In addition, four other finalists from the auditions were finalized as Liva Miss Diva contestants. The following contestants competed in the Liva Miss Diva 2020 pageant.

Crossovers & Returnees
Contestants who previously competed in previous editions of Liva Miss Diva and other local and international beauty pageants with their respective placements.

National Pageants 
Femina Miss India 2019
 Chhattisgarh: Anisha Sharma (Top 3)
 Chhattisgarh: Farhat Firoza (Top 3)
 Kerala: Archana Ravi (Top 3)
 Tamil Nadu: Suruthi Periyasamy (Top 3)
 Uttarakhand: Shivangi Sharma (Top 3)

Glamanand Supermodel India
 2018: Nishi Bhardawaj (Miss Earth India)

 2021: Anisha Sharma (2nd Runner Up)

 2021: Archana Ravi (Top 8)

India's Next Top Model
 2018: Rushali Yadav (2nd Runner-up)

Elite Miss Rajasthan
 2016: Neha Jaiswal (Winner)
 2018: Arshina Sumbul (Winner)

International Pageants 
Miss Earth
 2018: Nishi Bhardawaj

Miss Super Globe
 2018: Archana Ravi (1st Runner-up)

References

Notes

2020 beauty pageants
2019 in India
Miss Diva
February 2020 events in India